Elos is a village and a municipality in the southern part of Laconia, Greece.

Elos may also refer to:

 Elos, Chania, a village in Chania, Crete, Greece
 Elos Elonga-Ekakia (born 1974), a retired Congolese footballer
 BANK KITAYa (ELOS), a bank in Russia

See also
 Ellös, Orust Municipality, Västra Götaland County, Sweden